Yoshino Shrine (吉野神宮, Yoshino jingū) is a Shinto shrine located in Yoshino, Yoshino District, Nara Prefecture, Japan. Prefecture, Japan. It was founded in 1892. The main kami enshrined here is Emperor Go-Daigo. The shrine's main festival is held annually on September 27. It was formerly an imperial shrine of the first rank (官幣大社, kanpei taisha) in the Modern system of ranked Shinto Shrines.

It is one of the Fifteen Shrines of the Kenmu Restoration.

See also
List of Jingū
Beppyo shrines
Kanpei-taisha

External links

Official website

Shinto shrines in Nara Prefecture
1892 establishments in Japan
Emperor Go-Daigo